HMS Ganges was a 74-gun third-rate ship of the line of the Royal Navy, launched in 1782 at Rotherhithe. She was the first ship of the Navy to bear the name, and was the name ship of her class. She saw active service from 1782 to 1811, in Europe and the West Indies.

Origins
The British East India Company had Randall build a 74-gun ship under the name Bengal. They then presented (donated) her to the Royal Navy, which renamed her HMS Ganges.

The Royal Navy commissioned Ganges in February 1782 under the command of Captain Charles Fielding. She was paid-off in March, but immediately recommissioned under Captain J. Lutterell as a guardship at Portsmouth. Between 1784 and 1787, she was under the command of Captain Sir Roger Curtis. In October 1787 she became the flagship of Rear-Admiral Sir Francis Drake. She was recommissioned in December 1790 under Captain Anthony Molloy.

French Revolutionary Wars
In 1794, whilst under the command of Captain William Truscott, she and  captured the French corvette Jacobine. Jacobin was armed with twenty-four 12-pounder guns, and had a crew of 220 men; she  was nine days out of Brest and taken nothing. The Royal Navy took Jacobin into service as HMS Matilda.

Ganges was part of the squadron commanded by Admiral John Gell, which escorted a Spanish ship they had captured from the French back to Portsmouth. The ownership of the ship was a matter of some debate and was not settled until 4 February 1795, when the value of the cargo was put at £935,000. At this time all the crew, captains, officers and admirals received a share of the prize money, Admiral Hood taking away £50,000.

Ganges was under the command of Captain Thomas Fremantle at the Battle of Copenhagen. She had on board a contingent of soldiers from the 49th Foot, commanded by Isaac Brock. Their mission was to storm the forts at Copenhagen, but the outcome of the naval battle made the assault unnecessary.

Napoleonic Wars
Ganges was one of six British warships that shared in the capture on 23 August 1807 of the Danish vessel Speculation.

Ganges was also present at the Second Battle of Copenhagen. She bore the flag of Commodore Richard Goodwin Keats, and was commanded by Captain Peter Halkett. During the battle Keats placed a portrait of Admiral Nelson on the mizzen mast where it was said to have encouraged officers and men alike despite being covered in the blood and brains of an unfortunate seaman.

There were no British casualties.

Fate
She was commissioned as a prison ship on 12 December 1811 for holding prisoners of war. Then in 1814 she was transferred to the Transport Board. Ganges was broken up at Plymouth in 1816.

Notes

References

Lavery, Brian (2003) The Ship of the Line - Volume 1: The development of the battlefleet 1650-1850. Conway Maritime Press. .

J. Wright (printer) (1807) The Annual Register, or a view of the History, Politics, and Literature, for the year 1795. Google Books. Retrieved 6 October 2008.
HMS Ganges Association History Royal Navy. HMS Ganges Association. Retrieved 1 November 2008.

Ships of the line of the Royal Navy
Ganges-class ships of the line
1782 ships